The Group A of the 2022 AFF Championship were one of the two groups of competing nations in the 2022 AFF Championship. It consists of Thailand, Philippines, Indonesia, Cambodia, and Brunei. The matches took place from 20 December 2022 to 2 January 2023.

Thailand and Indonesia advanced to the semi-finals as the top two teams on the group.

Teams

Standings

Matches

Cambodia vs Philippines

Brunei vs Thailand

Philippines vs Brunei

Indonesia vs Cambodia

Brunei vs Indonesia

Thailand vs Philippines

Cambodia vs Brunei

Indonesia vs Thailand

Thailand vs Cambodia

Philippines vs Indonesia

References

Notes

External links 
 Official Website

Group stage